Henry O'Neill (born 27 December 1964) is a former Northern Irish professional darts player who played in Professional Darts Corporation (PDC) events.

Darts career
O'Neill played in the 2004 PDC World Darts Championship, losing in the last 48 to Robbie Widdows of England.

World Championship performances

PDC
 2004: Last 48: (lost to Robbie Widdows 2–3) (sets)

References

External links

Darts players from Northern Ireland
Professional Darts Corporation former pro tour players
1964 births
Living people
Sportspeople from Derry (city)